Mignon is a 1922 German silent film directed by Preben J. Rist and starring Ida Andorffy and Lotte Behrendt.

Cast
 Ida Andorffy as Mignon
 Gustav Adolf Semler as Wilhelm Meister
And in alphabetical order
 Lotte Behrendt as Sperata
 Albrecht Viktor Blum
 Eugen Burg as Marchese Cypriani
 Walburga Gmür
 Alexander Granach as Il Gobbo
 Sascha Gura as Philine
 Max Hochstetter
 Hans Jensen as Friedrich
 Helmut Kraus as Laertes
 Willy Lengling
 Lotte Lorenz
 Josef Rehberger as Graf
 Preben J. Rist as Gran Diavolo
 Margot Seidel as Mignon im vorspiel
 Viktor Senger as Agolfine
 Siegbert Steinfeld

References

Bibliography
 Jill Nelmes & Jule Selbo. Women Screenwriters: An International Guide. Palgrave Macmillan, 2015.

External links

1922 films
Films based on works by Johann Wolfgang von Goethe
Films of the Weimar Republic
German silent feature films
German black-and-white films
Works based on Wilhelm Meister's Apprenticeship